Farhan Afzal Khan, born 19 October 1975 in Multan, is a Pakistani-born cricketer who played for the Oman national cricket team. He is a right-handed batsman and right-arm medium-fast bowler. He made several appearances as a batsman in the 2005 Dallas ICC Trophy and has appeared in other List A cricket matches for the Oman national cricket team.

References

1975 births
Living people
Omani cricketers
Cricketers from Multan
Pakistani emigrants to Oman
Pakistani expatriates in Oman
Punjabi people